Badia rugosa is species of Senegalese palp-footed spiders (family Palpimanidae). It is the only species in the monotypic genus Badia. The species and genus were first described by Carl Friedrich Roewer in 1961. It is only found in Senegal.

See also
 List of Palpimanidae species

References

Palpimanidae
Spiders described in 1961
Spiders of Africa
Taxa named by Carl Friedrich Roewer